Thomas Stephens (Bardic names: Casnodyn, Gwrnerth, Caradawg) (21 April 1821 – 4 January 1875) was a Welsh historian, literary critic, and social reformer. His works include The Literature of the Kymry (1849,1876), Madoc: An Essay on the Discovery of America by Madoc ap Owen Gwynedd in the Twelfth Century (1858,1893), and Orgraff yr Iaith Gymraeg (1859) (an orthography of Welsh), as well as a number of prize-winning essays presented at eisteddfodau between 1840 and 1858. He was the first Welsh historian and literary critic to employ rigorous scientific methods, and is considered to have done more to raise the standards of the National Eisteddfod than any other Welshman of his time. Stephens also figured prominently in efforts to implement social, educational and sanitary reforms both locally in Merthyr Tydfil and more broadly throughout Wales.

Life 
Thomas Stephens was born on 21 April 1821 at Pont Nedd Fechan, Glamorganshire, Wales, the son of a boot-maker. In 1835 he was apprenticed as a chemist and druggist in Merthyr Tydfil and took over the business in 1841. He was also appointed manager of the Merthyr Express newspaper in 1864.

Stephens suffered a series of strokes from 1868. He died on 4 January 1875 in Merthy Tydfil and was buried at Cefncoedycymmer cemetery.

Writings 
Stephens began submitting prize-winning essays to eisteddfodau from 1840. His bardic names were Casnodyn, Gwrnerth, and Caradawg. Stephens' book, The Literature of the Kymry (1849, 2nd ed. 1876), was based on his essay "The Literature of Wales during the Twelfth and Succeeding Centuries" which won the Prince of Wales Prize at the 1848 eisteddfod held in Abergavenny. In this work, Stephens pioneered the use of rigorous methods of literary criticism in the study of medieval Welsh literature.

Stephens' 1858 eisteddfod essay Madoc: An Essay on the Discovery of America by Madoc ap Owen Gwynedd in the Twelfth Century, which demolished Welsh claims of the discovery of the Americas by Madoc, was acknowledged as the outstanding submission. However, although convincing, the essay was not awarded the prize due to the adjudicators' reluctance to discard the old claims. Disgusted, Stephens refused to compete in future eisteddfod competitions.

Other works include Orgraff yr Iaith Gymraeg (1859) (an orthography of the Welsh language), articles for Archaeologia Cambrensis and the South Wales newspapers and Welsh periodicals, essays on the life and works of the bard Aneurin, and an English translation of Y Gododdin.

The rigorous methods of literary criticism applied in his works often made Stephens unpopular with the less discriminating enthusiasts for the glory of Wales, but he earned the respect of serious scholars.

Stephens' manuscripts and letters are included in the National Library of Wales General Manuscript Collection.

Social reforms 
With the encouragement and friendship of Lord Aberdare, Sir Josiah John Guest, and Lady Charlotte Guest, Stephens was a prominent promoter of welfare, education and sanitary schemes in Merthyr Tydfil and organised relief for families of victims of coal mine explosions. He was appointed High Constable of Merthyr in 1858.

Legacy 
Literary critic Meic Stephens states that Stephens "is generally considered to have been the first Welsh literary critic to adopt a scientific method and to have done more, as an adjudicator, to raise the standards of the National Eisteddfod and to win for it the confidence of scholars, than any other Welshman of his time". However, he also notes that author Emyr Humphreys presents a "less favourable view" in his 1983 work The Taliesin Tradition.

Stephens' modern biographer Marion Löffler describes his "main contributions to the shaping of Wales" in terms of his work to transform Merthyr's social organisation and modernise Welsh culture, and "his pioneering works of scholarship".

Works 
  (eisteddfod essay)
  (eisteddfod essay)
 
  (eisteddfod essay)
  (eisteddfod essay)
  (originally published as The Gododdin of Aneurin Gwawdrydd: An English Translation with Copious Explanatory Notes; A Life of Aneurin; and Several Lengthy Dissertations Illustrative of the "Gododdin", and the Battle of Cattraeth)
  (eisteddfod essay)
 
 A series of critical essays, including:
 
 
 
 
 Numerous shorter articles in newspapers such as The Cambrian, The Merthyr Guardian, The Monmouthshire Merlin, and The Silurian, and in periodicals including Seren Gomer, Yr Ymofynnydd, Y Traethodydd, and Y Beirniad.

(Sources for works: Dictionary of Welsh Biography, National Library of Wales, Stephens, NLW Welsh newspapers)

References

Further reading

External Sources 

 
 
 
 The Life of Thomas Stephens. 1876.
 A List of the Mss. Essays and Writings of Thomas Stephens. 1876.
 Notable Men of Wales. Thomas Stephens. 1882.
  (Portrait of Stephens once in Cardiff Reference Library)
 
 Stephens, Thomas. 1908. (Biography)
  (Connections with Joseph Edwards and Charles Wilkins)
  (Includes Stephens' birthplace)
 
 

Welsh literary critics
19th-century Welsh historians
Celtic studies scholars
1821 births
1875 deaths
19th-century British journalists
British male journalists
19th-century British male writers
People from Merthyr Tydfil